Wilfred Francis Greaves (born 7 December 1935 – 26 August 2020) was a Canadian amateur light middleweight and professional light middle/middle/light heavyweight boxer of the 1950s and '60s who as an amateur won the gold medal at light middleweight in the Boxing at the 1954 British Empire and Commonwealth Games in Vancouver, British Columbia, Canada, and as a professional won the Canada middleweight title, and British Commonwealth middleweight title, his professional fighting weight varied from , i.e. light middleweight to , i.e. light heavyweight. Wilf Greaves was managed by Jacob Mintz.

Boxing career
Greaves had his first fight against Lee Owens in Syracuse, New York ending in a draw by points.

References

External links

Image - Wilf Greaves
Image - Wilf Greaves

1935 births
Light-heavyweight boxers
Light-middleweight boxers
Middleweight boxers
People from Parkland County
Sportspeople from Alberta
Boxers at the 1954 British Empire and Commonwealth Games
Commonwealth Games gold medallists for Canada
Living people
Canadian male boxers
Commonwealth Games medallists in boxing
Medallists at the 1954 British Empire and Commonwealth Games